Nicole Shortland (born 6 March 1996), known professionally as Nikki Ambers and previously as Little Nikki, is an English singer-songwriter from London. She is best known for her 2013 single "Little Nikki Says", which peaked at number 53 on the UK Singles Chart. She was also a member of SoundGirl.

Career

2010–12: SoundGirl

She started off as a member of SoundGirl, They released the single "Don't Know Why" in June 2011, which peaked at number 45 on the UK Singles Chart. They also put two singles that were never released on their YouTube account, "The Game" and "Walking on Air". The band split up in April 2012.

2012–present: Breakthrough
On 2 November 2012, she released her debut single "Intro Intro". On 26 April 2013, she released her second single "Where I'm Coming From". On 6 September 2013 she released her third single "Little Nikki Says" which was used for the advertisement for the summer range for Boohoo.com where Little Nikki and Boohoo created the "first ever shoppable music video", the song peaked at number 53 on the UK Singles Chart. She was featured on Maxsta's "Wanna Go", the song was released on 29 September 2013, the song peaked at number 43 on the UK Singles Chart. In addition, she co-wrote the song Towers from Little Mix's second album Salute. She has confirmed that her single "YoYo" was used in another Boohoo.com advert for their Autumn/Winter range. Nikki features on the 2014 DJ Fresh vs. TC single "Make U Bounce", a rework of TC's 2012 song "Make You Bounce", released on 22 June.

On 2 February 2019, she performed on The Voice UK.

Discography

Singles

As lead artist

As featured artist

Music videos

References

1996 births
Living people
Singers from London
21st-century Black British women singers
English people of Ghanaian descent
British contemporary R&B singers
UK garage singers
Mercury Records artists
Columbia Records artists
Sony Music UK artists
The Voice UK contestants